Sebastian Kosiorowski (born 21 May 1990 in Poland) is a Polish former footballer.

Career

Kosiorowski started his senior career with Korona Kielce in 2006. In 2013, he signed for Helmond Sport in the Dutch Eerste Divisie and made two appearances and scored zero goals. After that, he played again for Polish club Gwarek Ornontowice before retiring in 2019.

References

External links 
 Polską rządzą układy - rozmowa z Sebastianem Kosiorowskim, bramkarzem Motherwell FC 
 Sebastian Kosiorowski: polubiłem Motherwell, ale nie miałem tam szans na grę 
 Kosiorowski: w Szkocji mnie cenią
 Bramkarz Sebastian Kosiorowski szuka klubu 
 Echo Dnia Świętokrzyskie Korona Kielce zagra ze Śląskiem Wrocław w meczu ostatniej kolejki ekstraklasy (WIDEO) 
 22. Sebastian Kosiorowski 
 90minut Profile
 Łączy nas piłka Profile

1990 births
Living people
Expatriate footballers in Scotland
Motherwell F.C. players
Kolejarz Stróże players
Jagiellonia Białystok players
Helmond Sport players
Sandecja Nowy Sącz players
Polish footballers
Polish expatriate footballers
Association football goalkeepers
Korona Kielce players
Garbarnia Kraków players
Górnik Wieliczka players
Expatriate footballers in the Netherlands